2003–04 DePaul Blue Demons men's basketball team represented DePaul University as a member of Conference USA during the 2003–04 men's college basketball season. The team was led by head coach Dave Leitao and played their home games at Allstate Arena in Rosemont, Illinois. The Blue Demons finished in a 5-way tie atop the conference regular season standings, reached the championship game of the Conference USA Tournament, and received an at-large bid to the NCAA tournament. Playing as the No. 7 seed in the Phoenix regional, DePaul defeated Dayton in overtime in the opening round before losing to eventual National champion Connecticut in the second round 72–55. The team finished the season with a record of 22–10 (12–4 C-USA).

Roster

Schedule and results

|-
!colspan=9 style=| Regular season

|-
!colspan=9 style=| Conference USA tournament

|-
!colspan=9 style=| NCAA tournament

References 

DePaul Blue Demons men's basketball seasons
DePaul
DePaul
DePaul Blue Demons men's basketball
DePaul Blue Demons men's basketball